The 2021 North Carolina Tar Heels women's soccer team represented the University of North Carolina at Chapel Hill during the 2021 NCAA Division I women's soccer season. It was the 45th season of the university fielding a program. The Tar Heels were led by 45th year head coach Anson Dorrance and played their home games at Dorrance Field in Chapel Hill, North Carolina.

They finished the season 12–3–3, 5–2–3 in ACC play to finish in a tie for sixth place.  Only six teams qualified for the ACC Tournament and the Tar Heels lost the tiebreaker to Wake Forest and did not qualify for the tournament.  This was the first time in program history that North Carolina missed out on the ACC Tournament.  They received an at-large bid to the 2021 NCAA Division I Women's Soccer Tournament where they lost to South Carolina in the First Round.  Their First Round exit was the earliest exit of any NCAA Tournament they had participated in.

Previous season 

Due to the COVID-19 pandemic, the ACC played a reduced schedule in 2020 and the NCAA Tournament was postponed to 2021.  The ACC did not play a spring league schedule, but did allow teams to play non-conference games that would count toward their 2020 record in the lead up to the NCAA Tournament.

The Tar Heels finished the fall season 11–1–0, 8–0–0 in ACC play to finish in first place.  As the second seed in the ACC Tournament, they defeated Virginia Tech, and Virginia, before losing to Florida State in the final.  The Tar Heels finished the spring season 4–0 and received an at-large bid to the NCAA Tournament.  As the second seed in the tournament, they defeated Denver in the Second Round, Washington in the Third Round, and Texas A&M in the Quarterfinals before losing to Santa Clara in the Semifinals to end their season.

Squad

Roster

Team management 

Source:

Schedule

Source:

|-
!colspan=6 style=""| Exhibition

|-
!colspan=6 style=""| Non-conference Regular season

|-
!colspan=6 style=""| ACC Regular Season

|-
!colspan=6 style=""| NCAA Tournament

Awards and honors

Rankings

2022 NWSL Draft

Source:

References 

North Carolina
North Carolina
2021
North Carolina women's soccer
North Carolina